South Korean actor Jang Keun-suk released several Japanese language studio albums, as well as several original soundtracks for dramas and films he starred in.

Studio albums

Singles

OST
2004
Nonstop 4 OST (Regular Edition) 
 Sky High / Nornsttop Band
 논밴송 / Nonstop Band
 Happy! Happy Birthday / Nonstop Band
 Let's Get Down / Jang Keun-suk
 우리가 있잖아 / Nonstop Band

2007
The Happy Life OST (Regular)
 The Happy Life (Radio Edit. Ver.) / Hwal Hwa San
 It'll Explode (Ver. 3) / Hwal Hwa San
 It'll Explode 2007 (Ver. 2) / Hwal Hwa San
 Fireworks / Hwal Hwa San
 The Happy Life (For Film) / Hwal Hwa San
The Happy Life OST (Single)
 The Happy Life (Main Theme) / Hwal Hwa San (Active Volcano)
 It'll Explode / Hwal Hwa San

2008
 Black Engine (Single)
 Black Engine / Jang Keun-suk
[Film] Doremifasolatido OST
 Full of Sunshine / Jang Keun-suk
 Time for Waiting / Jang Keun-suk
Beethoven Virus OST (Single)
 Can You Hear Me Part 2 / Jang Keun-suk

2009
 You're Beautiful OST (Regular)
 Still / A.N. Jell
 Promise / A.N. Jell
 Fly Me To The Moon / Jang Keun-suk & Park Shin-hye
You're Beautiful OST Part 2 (Regular)
 Without Words / Jang Keun-suk
 Good Bye / Jang Keun-suk
You're Beautiful OST (Jang Keun-suk Special Edition)
 Promise / A.N. Jell
 Still / A.N. Jell
 Without Words / Jang Keun-suk
 What Should I Do? / Jang Keun-suk
 Good Bye / Jang Jang
 Just Drag (Single)
 Just Drag / Jang Jang
 Toucholic Yepptic & Haptic love (Single)
 Toucholic Yepptic & Haptic love / Jang Jang

2010
 Mary Stayed Out All Night OST Part 1 
Take Care, My Bus! / Jang Jang
My Precious / Jang Jang
 Mary Stayed Out All Night OST Part 2
Hello, Hello / Jang Jang
I Will Promise You / Jang Jang
Hello, Hello (Ballad Ver.) / Jang Jang
 Mary Stayed Out All Night OST Part 3
Because of Her/ Jang Jang

2011
You're My Pet OST
You're My Pet Kiwobwassong /Jang Keun-suk & Kim Ha-neul
Oh, My Lady! / Jang Keun-suk & Choi Sang-mi
Mandy / Jang Keun-suk
I Only Look At You / Jang Keun-suk & Kim Ha-neul
 You're My Pet OST (Single)
You're My Pet Kiwobwassong / Jang Jang & Kim Ha-neul

2012
 Love Rain OST Part II
Love Rain / Jang Keun-suk
2013
  Pretty Man  OST Part 6 
Beautiful Day / Jang Keun-suk
  Pretty Man  OST CDs
Beautiful Day / Jang Keun-suk
A bright and happy day / Jang Keun-Suk 
Lovely girl (Japanese version) / Jang Keun Suk  

You're My Pet OST (Japanese Version)
 Hey Girl (Jang Keun-suk ver.)

Music video

References

Discographies of South Korean artists